Sirico is a surname of Italian origin. Notable people with the surname include:
 
Robert Sirico (born 1951), American Roman Catholic priest
Tony Sirico (1942–2022), American character actor

See also
 Sirio
 Sirica
 Serpico 

Surnames of Italian origin